Howard Edward Mudd (February 10, 1942 – August 12, 2020) was an American football offensive lineman and coach. He attended Midland High School and then Michigan State University. While at Michigan State he joined Delta Tau Delta International Fraternity. Mudd played football for Hillsdale College from 1960 to 1963, where he was a starting guard and a team captain. His play at the school led to his induction into the NAIA Hall of Fame. He then played seven seasons in the National Football League (NFL) for the San Francisco 49ers and Chicago Bears from 1964 to 1970. Mudd was a three-time Pro Bowler, in 1966, 1967, and 1968. He retired in 1971 due to a knee injury, and began his coaching career at the University of California the following year.

From 1998 to 2009, he was the offensive line coach for the Indianapolis Colts, with whom he won Super Bowl XLI. For his work as an assistant coach, Mudd earned the Pro Football Writers of America Lifetime Achievement Award.

Coaching career
Mudd pursued a coaching career following his retirement as an NFL player. He spent two years as an assistant coach at the University of California, before moving to the NFL, and coaching for the San Diego Chargers, San Francisco 49ers, Seattle Seahawks, Cleveland Browns and Kansas City Chiefs between 1974 and 1997.

He then joined the Indianapolis Colts as an offensive line coach, where he coached from 1998 to 2009. During his 12 years in Indianapolis, the Colts allowed the fewest sacks in the NFL, with 218 sacks in 182 games. This is especially impressive when the high number of passing plays the Colts attempted during that time period was taken into account. Peyton Manning played for the Colts for 11 of those 12 years, and credits much of his success to the protection he received from Mudd's front line.

On May 6, 2009, ESPN reported that Mudd had filed his retirement papers due to a change in the NFL's pension program. On May 20, 2009, Mudd returned to the team as the senior offensive line coach. Mudd planned to retire for good following the Colts' game against the New Orleans Saints in Super Bowl XLIV.

In May 2010, Mudd and New Orleans Saints offensive line coach Aaron Kromer were together for a coaching clinic in Cincinnati, at which time Kromer approached Mudd about serving as a temporary consultant with the Saints. Mudd first advised the Saints during the 2010 offseason, then returned for the opening of training camp. In reference to his association with the Saints, Mudd said "He (Kromer) asked me to come down and spend a little time, and I said, 'OK'.  I'll only be here a couple of days. That's it."

Mudd was named the offensive line coach for the Philadelphia Eagles after being talked out of retirement on February 2, 2011. In Mudd's first season with the Eagles, they allowed 17 fewer sacks than they had the previous season, and helped LeSean McCoy lead the NFL in total touchdowns. Mudd retired at the conclusion of the 2012 season.

On February 7, 2019, the  Colts hired Mudd as a senior offensive assistant, however Mudd stepped down from the position on September 6, 2019.

Death 
Mudd died on August 12, 2020 at the age of 78, of injuries sustained in a motorcycle accident two weeks prior. Colts' owner Jim Irsay tweeted: "Rest in peace, Howard Mudd. Howard was a GREAT player during a shortened career and then became one of the game's all-time greatest offensive line coaches. He contributed to many different teams over 47 years in our league---but he will always be a Colt."

References

External links
Philadelphia Eagles bio

1942 births
2020 deaths
American football offensive guards
Chicago Bears players
Cleveland Browns coaches
Hillsdale College alumni
Hillsdale Chargers football players
Indianapolis Colts coaches
Kansas City Chiefs coaches
Michigan State Spartans football players
Midland High School (Midland, Michigan) alumni
Philadelphia Eagles coaches
Players of American football from Michigan
San Diego Chargers coaches
San Francisco 49ers coaches
San Francisco 49ers players
Seattle Seahawks coaches
Sportspeople from Midland, Michigan
Western Conference Pro Bowl players
Motorcycle road incident deaths
Road incident deaths in Washington (state)